Erdenetsogt Tsogtjargal is a Mongolian Olympic boxer. He represented his country in the light-flyweight division at the 1992 Summer Olympics. He won his first bout against Fernando Retayud, and then lost his second bout to Rogelio Marcelo.

References

External links
 

1971 births
Living people
Mongolian male boxers
Olympic boxers of Mongolia
Boxers at the 1992 Summer Olympics
Boxers at the 1994 Asian Games
Asian Games competitors for Mongolia
AIBA World Boxing Championships medalists
Light-flyweight boxers
20th-century Mongolian people
21st-century Mongolian people